No. 309 (Land of Czerwień) Polish Fighter-Reconnaissance Squadron  was one of several Polish squadrons in the Royal Air Force (RAF) during the Second World War. It was formed as part of an agreement between the Polish Government in Exile and the United Kingdom in 1940. It was at first a reconnaissance squadron but it was later converted into a fighter squadron.

History
The squadron was formed on 8 November 1940 in the RAF base at RAF Renfrew near Glasgow. The squadron was declared operational on 5 December 1940.

Commanders

Aircraft operated

External links

 Personnel of the Polish Air Force in Great Britain 1940-1947

309
309
309
309